Gylan Kain (sometimes simply KAIN, Kain or Kain the Poet) is an American poet and playwright.  He is a founding member, in 1968, of the Original Last Poets (along with Abiodun Oyewole and David Nelson, with Felipe Luciano soon added).  Kain personally created the aggressive, rhythmic delivery of spoken word aka performance poetry as it is known today. He often performs with hand drums or backing musicians such as saxophonists and bass guitarists.

His work has been sampled without pre-consent by well-known artists including Dr. Dre and The Prodigy. One of his performances was sampled into the club hit Voodoo People by The Prodigy. Dr. Dre sampled an excerpt of Kain performing his poem, "The Shalimar" on Dre's track entitled "Intro" from the album entitled "The Chronic." After legal action was successfully taken to procure compensation for work sampled by The Prodigy, spokespersons for The Prodigy claimed that efforts had been made to procure permission from Kain for use of his work but those efforts had been unsuccessful because Kain, who values privacy, could not be located in time. Dr. Dre has yet to compensate Kain for work sampled without prior consent. This has led some fans to criticize Dr. Dre as an hypocrite for exploiting the work of an influential Black artist after building a reputation as an empowering force in the black American community as a founding member of N.W.A.

Kain has done multimedia collaborations with the percussionist Z'EV and has appeared with the Dutch jazz/hip-hop/fusion group Electric Barbarian, appearing on their 2004 album él. He is also the subject of several documentary films.

His daughter, Amber Kain, is an actress and playwright. His adoptive son is actor Khalil Kain, best known for starring as "Raheem" in the 1992 crime thriller Juice featuring 2Pac.

Discography
1970 - KAIN:  The Blue Guerrilla.
1997 - Baby Kain: Feel This.
2004 - Electric Barbarian:  él.

Films
1971 - Right On!: Poetry on Film (Original Last Poets). Directed by Herbert Danska.
1990 - Wings of Fame.  Directed by Otakar Votocek.
2018 - "Ultramarine" directed by Vincent Meessen (belgique)

External links
Gylan Kain official site
Electric Barbarian official site

Audio
MP3 of "X-Cuse Me!" by Electric Barbarian featuring KAIN (click to listen)

Living people
Year of birth missing (living people)
African-American poets
American male poets
American spoken word poets
20th-century American poets
21st-century American poets
20th-century American male writers
21st-century American male writers
20th-century African-American writers
21st-century African-American writers
African-American male writers